, also known as , was a Japanese domain in the Edo period.  It is associated with Hizen Province in modern-day Saga Prefecture on the island of Kyushu.

In the han system, Saga was a political and economic abstraction based on periodic cadastral surveys and projected agricultural yields.  In other words, the domain was defined in terms of expected value of tax revenue (kokudaka), not land area. This was different from the feudalism of the West.

History 
The Nabeshima clan were originally vassals of the Ryūzōji clan who controlled the region. However, Ryūzōji Takanobu was killed in battle with the Shimazu and Arima clans in 1584, and Nabeshima Naoshige became the guardian of Takanobu's young heir, Ryūzōji Takafusa. Six years later, Toyotomi Hideyoshi granted approval for Nabeshima to overthrow Ryūzōji and seize the territory for his own lineage. Nabeshima supported Hideyoshi's invasions of Korea in the 1590s, and fought in the Western Army, against the Tokugawa clan in the fateful battle of Sekigahara in 1600. During this battle, however, he turned against and captured Western Army general Tachibana Muneshige, earning some degree of favor from Tokugawa Ieyasu and being allowed to keep his fief.
The domain was governed from Saga Castle in the capital city of Saga by the Nabeshima clan of tozama daimyō. Though the Dutch and Chinese trading posts in Nagasaki were overseen directly by officials of the Tokugawa shogunate, the domain was largely responsible for the military defense of the city and the port.

The Nabeshima enjoyed an income of 357,000 koku throughout the Tokugawa period, including among their vassals the lords of the nearby Ogi, Hasunoike, and Kashima Domains.

The domain's location close to Korea and far from Edo, the shogunal capital, along with its trade connections, brought significant foreign influence to the area. The area was a center for ceramic production and techniques as a result of its connections with Korea, becoming famous for its Imari porcelain which was a significant export good to Europe.

Edo period 
Remnants of the Ryūzōji continued to surface from time to time, however, and threatened the Nabeshima grip on power. Ryūzōji Takafusa died in 1607, and six years later an order was issued by the shogunate granting his brother, Ryūzōji Katsushige, control of the domain. Though officially bearing an income of 357,000 koku, the daimyō of Saga actually bore only 60,000 koku, the rest belonging to his vassals, the four branch families of the Ryūzōji (Taku, Takeo, Suko, Isahaya), and those of the Nabeshima (Shiroishi, Kubota, Murata, Kawakubō).

The area also bore a considerable Christian peasant population, which erupted in protest in the famous Shimabara Rebellion (1637–8).

The shogunate imposed upon Saga responsibility for defense of the port of Nagasaki and enforcement of the maritime restrictions (kaikin). Though this burden was shared with the Fukuoka Domain, each domain bearing these responsibilities in alternate years, it nevertheless frequently strained Saga's finances. As a result, it was not unknown for Saga to seek to lessen its losses by reducing the number of samurai it sent to defend the port. In October 1808, when  created an incident, capturing Dutch merchants and threatening Japanese and Chinese ships in the harbor, only 100 Saga samurai were present to deal with the situation, rather than the obligatory one thousand. As no further troops could be summoned to the port in time, the shogunate was forced to submit to the demands of the British ship, and scolded Saga harshly for its failure to fulfill its obligations. The domain would be further weakened by a typhoon in 1828 which cost Saga approximately 10,000 lives.

Towards the end of the Tokugawa period, elements within Saga sided with groups from Tosa, Satsuma, and Chōshū against the shogunate. Saga leaders would later turn against the new Meiji government, launching the Saga Rebellion in 1874, which ultimately failed.

Bakumatsu and Meiji Ishin 

Saga recovered in the last decade or so of the bakumatsu period (i.e. the 1860s), however, taking in Western technology and reforming the domain's governance. The bureaucracy was cut by 80%, and efforts were made to support and encourage the peasantry. The domain's economy came to be focused upon ceramics, tea, charcoal, and related goods, and prosperity was found through trade.

The tenth lord of Saga, Nabeshima Naomasa (r. 1830–61), established organizations for the research of Western technologies, including steel refining, steam engines and artillery, and turned the domain's efforts towards these pursuits, making it one of the most modern domains in this period. Saga thus began operations at the first Japanese iron refinery in 1849, and made the first use of reverberatory furnaces three years later. In 1853, Russian Admiral Yevfimy Putyatin arrived in Nagasaki harbor, and provided the first demonstration of a steam locomotive to the Japanese. Ishiguro Hirotsugu, Nakamura Kisuke, and Tanaka Hisashige were among the first Japanese engineers, who attempted to manufacture their own steam locomotives and steamships.

When the shogunate relaxed the restrictions on the construction of large ships, an order was placed with the Dutch. Saga saw the revitalization of Japan's shipbuilding industry, and the launching of the first Japanese steamship, the Ryōfūmaru. The Nagasaki naval academy was established in 1855, its first students coming from Saga. By 1866, the incorporation of British Armstrong Whitworth cannon made the ships at Nagasaki into the first Japanese Western-style ("modern") navy. The defense batteries at Shinagawa were also supplied by cannon from Saga.

Largely responsible for Japan's technological and military advancement, and holding much of the fruits of those labors, Saga attracted the attention of the shogunate, which kept a close eye on the domain until its fall in 1868. Saga played an important role in the Meiji Restoration, alongside the domains of Tosa, Satsuma, and Chōshū, and samurai from the domain fought the shogunate at the battle of Ueno and in other clashes of the Boshin War. As a result, the new Meiji government which emerged afterwards featured a number of figures from Saga, including Etō Shinpei, Ōkuma Shigenobu, Ōki Takatō, and Sano Tsunetami. Etō resigned from the government, however, along with a number of others in 1873 as the result of extensive disputes over invading Korea, an action which he, Saigō Takamori and others supported, but which was ultimately rejected by the council. Etō then organized the Saga Rebellion the following year, leading 3000 men in an assault against the new government which was quickly suppressed.

The feudal domains were abolished in 1871, and the Nabeshima clan given the title "marquis" (kōshaku) under the new kazoku peerage system.

The territory is today split between Saga and Nagasaki Prefectures.

List of daimyōs 
The hereditary daimyōs were head of the clan and head of the domain.

 Nabeshima clan, 1593–1647 (tozama; 357,000 koku)  The dates in the list below refer to the period as head of the han, not to birth-death dates.
 Nabeshima Katsushige (鍋島 勝茂, 1607–1657)
 Nabeshima Mitsushige (鍋島 光茂, 1657–1695)
 Nabeshima Tsunashige (鍋島 綱茂, 1695–1706)
 Nabeshima Yoshishige (鍋島 吉茂, 1707–1730)
 Nabeshima Muneshige (鍋島 宗茂, 1730–1738)
 Nabeshima Munenori (鍋島 宗教, 1738–1760)
 Nabeshima Shigemochi (鍋島 重茂, 1760–1770)
 Nabeshima Harushige (鍋島 治茂, 1770–1805)
 Nabeshima Narinao (鍋島 斉直, 1805–1830)
 Nabeshima Naomasa (鍋島 直正, 1830–1861)
 Nabeshima Naohiro (鍋島 直大, 1861–1871)

Genealogy (simplified)

 I. Nabeshima Katsushige, 1st Lord of Saga (cr. 1607) (1580–1657; r. 1607–1657)
Tadanao (1613–1635)
 II. Mitsushige, 2nd Lord of Saga (1632–1700; r. 1657–1695)
 III. Tsunashige, 3rd Lord of Saga (1652–1707; r. 1695–1706)
 IV. Yoshishige, 4th Lord of Saga (1664–1730; r. 1707–1730)
 V. Muneshige, 5th Lord of Saga (1687–1755; r. 1730–1738)
 VI. Munenori, 6th Lord of Saga (1718–1780; r. 1738–1760)
 VII. Shigemochi, 7th Lord of Saga (1733–1770; r. 1760–1770)
 VIII. Harushige, 5th Lord of Kashima, 8th Lord of Saga (1745–1805; r. 1770–1805)
 IX. Narinao, 9th Lord of Saga (1780–1839; r. 1805–1830)
 X. Naomasa, 10th Lord of Saga (1815–1871; r. 1830–1861)
 XI. Naohiro, 11th Lord of Saga, 17th family head, 1st Marquess(1846–1921; 11th Lord of Saga: 1861–1869, Governor of Saga: 1869–1871, 1st Marquess: 1884) 
Naomitsu, 18th family head, 2nd Marquess (1872–1943; 18th family head and 2nd Marquess: 1921–1943)
Naoyasu, 19th family head and 3rd Marquess (1907–1981; 19th family head and 3rd Marquess: 1943–1947, 13th family head: 1947–1981)
Naomoto, 20th family head (1935–2008; 20th family head: 1981–2008)
 Naoaki, 21st family head (b. 1959; 21st family head: 2008–present)
 Naoyori (b. 1991)

Other notable Saga natives 
 Ōkuma Shigenobu (大隈 重信)
 Etō Shinpei (江藤 新平)
 Shima Yoshitake (島 義勇)
 Ōki Takatō (大木 喬任)
 Sano Tsunetami (佐野 常民)
 Nabeshima Shigeyoshi (鍋島 茂義)
 Tanaka Hisashige (田中 久重)

See also 
 List of Han
 Abolition of the han system

References

External links

Domains of Japan
Meiji Restoration
Kyushu region